Soman Ambaat (also spelled Soman Ambatt or referred as just Soman)  is an Indian film director (Member of FEFKA) in Malayalam cinema. His debut film was Aayiram Abhilashangal (1984). This was followed by several films in Malayalam such as Manasariyathe (1984), Oppom Oppathinoppum (1986), and Agnimuhurtham (1987). He has also worked as Chief Associate director for movies like Jagadguru Adisankaran (1977), Shrimad Bhagwadgeeta (1977), Ashtamangalyam (1977), Harshabhaspam (1977), Pichipoo (1978, Manoradham (1978), Vilakkum veilchavum (1978), Aanakkalari (1978),  Kolillakam (1981), and Ponnum Poovum (1982).

Career
Born in Edappally, Kochi, Soman Ambaat completed his graduation from Bharat Mata college in Kochi. He left is banking profession to join the film industry. He started his career as Assistant Director to P. Bhaskaran followed by Associate Director for various films with directors like A. Vincent, P. N. Sundaram, P Gopikumar, Vijayanand and A B Raj. His first independent venture was Aayiram Abhilashangal in 1984, which was a suspense thriller with a varied film treatment. This movie starred Mammotty, Sukumaran, Soman, Maneka and Swapna in lead roles. He then directed Manasariyathe (1984) starring Mohanlal, Zarina Wahab, Nedumudi Venu, Sattar and Jagathy. Mohanlal starrer megahit Malayalam movie Drishyam (2013) movie had similar story line to the movie Manasariyathe. In 1986, he directed the movie Oppom Oppathinoppum starring Mohanlal, Menaka, Shankar and Lalu alex. In 1987 he directed a family drama Agnimuhurtam with Rateesh and Urvashi. His movie Ennum Maarodanaykkan in 1986 was not completed.

Filmography
As Director

Personal life
Soman Ambaat is married to Latha, daughter of film editor K Sankunni.

References

External links
 

Film directors from Kochi
Malayalam film directors
1953 births
Living people
20th-century Indian film directors